Bárbara Pucheta Vélez (born 18 June 1994), also known as Barbie Vélez, is an Argentine actress, model and TV host.

Biography 
She was born on 18 June 1994, in the neighborhood of Quilmes, in Buenos Aires. She is the daughter of Alejandro Pucheta and the vedette Nazarena Vélez. She has two younger brothers on her mother's side, Gonzalo and Thiago.

Career 
Vélez debuted at the age of 17 working for clothing brands, in the summer of 2011, for one of the works by Gerardo Sofovich and René Bertrand, Flor de pito, playing Lola Minicicci.In 2012, she plays the character of a "fan" in Pedro Afonso's theatrical comedy Bachelorette Party.

She made her television debut in 2013 in the soap opera Los Grimaldi: una familia de locos, produced by her mother Nazarena Vélez and broadcast by elnueve, she also participated in the plays of this soap opera. She was one of the co-stars of the comedy play Family of Women, along with the actresses Luisa Kuliok, Haydée Padilla, Gladys Florimonte, Luisa Albinoni, Dalma Maradona and Ernestina Pais, among others.

In 2014 she appears in the telenovela Somos familia starring Gustavo Bermúdez and Ana María Orozco, where Barbie plays the character of Olivia Navarro González, the daughter of Pablo Navarro and Mabel González, played respectively by Fabián Vena and Adriana Salonia, broadcast by Telefe. In the same year she was invited to Your face sounds familiar 2  on several occasions.

In the 2015 she participates in the Dancing for a dream 2015 along with Ignacio Pérez Cortés, becoming one of the ten finalists. She also worked in Esperanza mía playing Milagros del Pombo, secretary of Máximo Ortiz (Tomás Fonzi).

In 2016 she participated again in the Dancing for a dream'' in his eleventh season this time together with Maximiliano Buitrago, again becoming among the top ten. In 2018 she made a special participation in Millennials as Paula. She was a participant in Famous Dressmaking, achieving recognition by the juries for her modern ideas when designing garments. And in 2022 she replaced Denise Dumas in the Argentine version of  Celebrity MasterChef to later become the main participant.

Filmography

Series and soap operas

Movies

Reality shows

References

External link

Argentine actresses
Bailando por un Sueño (Argentine TV series) participants
Living people
1994 births